Alpha ( or ) is the first letter of the Greek alphabet.

Alpha or ALPHA may also refer to:

Letters
 Latin alpha, a letter of the Latin alphabet
 , a glyph in the International Phonetic Alphabet
 , a vowel in the General Alphabet of Cameroon Languages
 Alfa, the first letter in the NATO phonetic alphabet

Art and entertainment

Books and comics
 Alpha (Lombard), a Franco-Belgian comics series
 The Alphas, a young-adult novel series by Lisi Harrison
 Alpha 1 through Alpha 9, anthologies edited by Robert Silverberg

Film and TV
 Alpha (2018 film), an American film starring Kodi Smit-McPhee
 Alpha (2019 film), a Bangladeshi film
 Alphas, an American science fiction TV series 2011–2012
 "Alpha" (The X-Files), a sixth-season episode of The X-Files
 Alpha and Omega (radio plays)

Fictional characters and places
 Alpha (DC Comics), a character from DC Comics
 Alpha (Marvel Comics), a character from Marvel Comics
 Alpha (The Walking Dead, an antagonist from the Walking Dead comic and TV series
 Alpha 4 (Power Rangers), Alpha 5 (Power Rangers), Alpha 6 (Power Rangers), or Alpha 7 (Power Rangers), characters in the Power Rangers universe
 Alpha the Ultimate Mutant, a character in Marvel Comics
 Moonbase Alpha (Space: 1999), the primary setting for the television series Space: 1999
 Alpha, a wolf character in the animated film Storks
 Alpha, the lead dog from the 2009 animated film Up
 Alpha Trion, an autobot character in The Transformers
 Alpha, a fictional computer in Mike Walker's radio play Alpha

Gaming
 Alpha (Magic: The Gathering), a card set
 Alpha (video game), released in 1986

Music
 Alpha, a French early music label record label, now part of Outhere
 Alpha chord, in the octatonic scale
 Alpha (band), a British electronic music group

Albums
 Alpha (Alice Nine album) (2007)
 Alpha (Asia album) (1983)
 Alpha (Charlotte Day Wilson album) (2021)
 Alpha (CL album) (2021)
 Alpha (Jelena Karleuša album) (2021)
 Alpha (Selena album) (1986)
 Alpha (Sevendust album) (2007)
 Alpha (Shenseea album) (2022)
 Alpha (War of Ages album) (2017)

Songs
 "Alpha" (song), a 2014 song by Kollegah
 "Alpha", a track on the 1976 album Albedo 0.39 by Vangelis
 "Alpha", a song by C418 from the 2013 soundtrack Minecraft – Volume Beta

Business
 Alpha Bank, a Greek bank, or their stock symbol ALPHA
 Alpha Books, an imprint of Penguin Group
 Alpha Industries, an American clothing company
 Alpha Media, an American radio broadcasting company
 Alpha TV, a Greek terrestrial channel
 Alpha Video, an American entertainment company
 Alpha, a streaming service operated by Legendary Entertainment from 2016 to 2019
 Alpha (Australian magazine), an Australian men's sport magazine
 Alpha, an investor magazine, later incorporated into Absolute Return + Alpha

People
 Alpha (given name), a list of people with the name
 Jenny Alpha (1910–2010), Martinique-born French actress and singer

Places

United States
 Alpha, California, a ghost town
 Alpha, Illinois, a village
 Alpha, Iowa, an unincorporated community
 Alpha, Kentucky, an unincorporated community
 Alpha, Maryland, an unincorporated community
 Alpha, Michigan, a village
 Alpha, Minnesota, a city
 Alpha, Missouri, an unincorporated community
 Alpha, New Jersey, a borough
 Alpha, Ohio, a neighborhood of the city of Beavercreek
 Alpha, Oregon, an unincorporated community
 Alpha (Morristown, Tennessee), a neighborhood
 Alpha, Texas, an unincorporated freedman's town
 Alpha, Virginia, an unincorporated community
 Alpha, Washington, an unincorporated community
 Alpha, Wisconsin, an unincorporated community
 Alpha Ridge, Alaska, a mountain ridge

Elsewhere
 Alpha, Queensland, a town in Australia
 Alpha Ridge, an undersea ridge in the Arctic Ocean

Science, technology and mathematics

Computing
 Alpha (programming language), an early database language
 Alpha compositing, an image processing technique
 Alpha phase of a software release life cycle
 AlphaServer, DEC now HP machine successor to the VAX 
 AlphaStation, DEC now HP workstation successor to the VAX
 DEC Alpha, an instruction set architecture developed by Digital Equipment Corporation (DEC)
 Wolfram Alpha, a computational knowledge engine

Mathematics and statistics
 Alpha (finance), a measurement of active return on an investment
 Cronbach's alpha, a statistical measure of reliability
 Angular eccentricity (conventional symbol "α")
 Navigational azimuth (symbol "α")
 One of the Feigenbaum constants describing a bifurcation diagram, in mathematics (symbol "α")
 α, a symbol representing the probability of a type I error in statistics
 The inverse Ackermann function
 α, sometimes used as a placeholder for ordinal numbers

Science
 Alpha (ethology) (also "alpha male" and "alpha female"), the highest ranking individuals in a community of social animals
 ALPHA, a particle physics experiment at CERN
 ALPHA Collaboration, (Antihydrogen Laser PHysics Apparatus), a team of scientists
 Alpha particle, form of particle radiation
 Alpha waves, recorded by electroencephalography
 Angle of attack in aerodynamics (symbol "α")
 Angular acceleration in physics (symbol "α")
 Coefficient of thermal expansion in thermodynamics (symbol "α")
 Fine-structure constant in physics (symbol "α")
 Thermal diffusivity in thermodynamics (symbol "α")
 Common-base current gain of a transistor in electronics (symbol "α")
 α, the isotope fractionation factor between two substances in geochemistry
 Alpha, the brightest star in a constellation according to the Bayer designation
 α receptors, a type of Adrenergic receptor
 SARS-CoV-2 Alpha variant, one of the variants of SARS-CoV-2, the virus that causes COVID-19
 A class of Immunoglobulin heavy chains that defines IgA type antibodies
 Alpha helixes, which are a type of secondary protein structures

Technology
 Alpha (navigation), a Russian radio navigation system
 Minolta Alpha, the Japanese name for a series of SLR cameras known as Maxxum or Dynax elsewhere
 Sony α or Sony Alpha, a digital SLR series by Sony, direct successor to the Minolta Alpha series
 Samsung Galaxy Alpha, 2014 Android smartphone by Samsung

Transportation
 GM Alpha platform, the underpinning of various GM vehicles
 Alpha (sternwheeler), a 19th-century river vessel
 Advance Alpha, a Swiss paraglider design
 Alpha 2000, a light aircraft built in New Zealand
 Firefly Alpha, an orbital rocket
 Kohler Alpha, an American glider
 Pipistrel Alpha Trainer, a Slovenian light-sport aircraft

Tropicalsubtropical cyclones
 Subtropical Storm Alpha (1972), first storm of the 1972 Atlantic hurricane season
 Tropical Storm Alpha (2005), twenty-third storm of the 2005 Atlantic hurricane season
 Subtropical Storm Alpha (2020), twenty-second storm of the 2020 Atlantic hurricane season

Other uses
 ALPHA (psychedelic), a psychedelic drug
 Generation Alpha, the demographic cohort succeeding Generation Z
 Alpha course, an introductory course in Christianity
 Alpha Group, a Russian counterterrorism unit
 Alpha Secondary School, a high school in Burnaby, British Columbia, Canada
 Alpha Boys School, a school in Kingston, Jamaica
 Alpha, or Service "A", one of the uniforms of the United States Marine Corps

See also
 
 
Alpha and Omega (disambiguation)
Alpha value (disambiguation)
Alfa (disambiguation)
Moonbase Alpha (disambiguation)
A, the letter
Space Station Alpha
Space Complex Alpha